Paul Bradley Couling (born 27 February 1944 in Llanfrechfa, Wales), known by his stage name Mal Ryder, is a British singer who achieved popularity in Italy in the late 1960s, singing with his band Mal and the Primitives.

References

External links
 Mal Ryder's official home page
 Mal Ryder and the Spirits at California Ballroom
 [http://www.theprimitives.com

Living people
1944 births
Welsh expatriates in Italy
British emigrants to Italy